Kalewal Fattu is a small Indian village located in Hoshiarpur district. The members of clan in this village traces back the origin to village Shanker in Jalandhar.(according to land acquisition records if 1961 the agriculture land belongs to this family was still under Rai Singh's name)
This village was settled by Rai Singh Purewal.  He named it Kalewal Fattu after his son Fateh Singh Purewal, that is why it is called Kalewal Fattu, Fattu for Fateh.

The prominent leader of the pind and World wide leader of the clan is Manbiar Purewal who currently resides in the UK.

Other famous villagers include Late Sardar Basant Singh Purewal, Late Sardar Dalip Singh Purewal, Late Major Mehnga Singh Purewal, Late Joginder Singh Purewal, Late Dr. Gurdev Singh Purewal, Dr. Jasvinder Purewal, Major Dr. Madankirpal Singh Purewal, Major Dr. Naranjan Singh Purewal, Narinder Singh Purewal, Capt.Kuldip singh purewal, Kudan Singh Purewal, Paramjit Singh Purewal, Satvir singh Purewal (sarpanch),Major Surjit Singh Purewal, Balbir Singh Purewal, Sarab Jit singh purewal, Manmohan singh Purewal, Satbir singh Purewal, Parvinderjit Singh Purewal, Varinderjit Singh Purewal, Sarvinderjit Singh Purewal, Mota Singh, Tarsem sing purewal,Nirmal singh purewal,Gurmej singh purewal,Parkash singh purewal,Pakhar singh purewal,Lashkar Singh Purewal,Bacitar Singh Purewal,Chanan Singh Purewal,Andip Singh Purewal, Bobby Singh Purewal,Mandip Kaur Purewal, Manjit Singh Purewal, Nerinder Pal Singh Purewal, David Singh Purewal,Jasbinder Pal Singh Purewal, Hajara Singh Purewal>(famous sportsmen of Kalewal fattu)
Late Avtar singh Purewal, Gian singh Purewal, Mohinder Singh Purewal, Late Charanjit Singh Purewal, Ramandeep Singh Purewal, Sunita Purewal, Rupeena Purewal, Tajinder Singh Purewal, Ravneet Purewal

The village is almost emptied out of people as most of them have migrated to countries like USA, Canada, Australia and England in search of a better prospects and advancements. Although they all agree life was best when they lived in Kalewal Fattu. 

Hoshiarpur
Villages in Hoshiarpur district